Nihad Izić (born 20 June 1959) is a Turkish-Bosnian professional basketball coach and former player.

Playing career 
Izić started to play basketball in his hometown team Radnik Bijeljina. Afterwards, he joined Bosna where he won an EuroLeague title for the 1978–79 season. Izić won two Yugoslav Leagues and a Yugoslav Cup with Bosnia, alongside Mirza Delibašić, Ratko Radovanović, and Žarko Varajić.

In 1982, Izić moved to Istanbul, Turkey where he played for İstanbul Bankası Yenişehir and Galatasaray. He retired as a player with Galatasaray in 1987.

National team career
Izic was a member of the Yugoslavia Juniors team that won the bronze medal at the 1978 European Championship for Juniors held in Italy. Over six tournament games, he averaged 14.9 points per game.

Coaching career 
Izic coached Fenerbahçe during the 2000–01 TBL season.

Izic won the 2nd-tier Turkish First League in 2009 with Tofaş.

Turkey national teams 
In 1994, the Turkish Basketball Federation added Izic to youth coaching staff.

Izic was the head coach of the Turkey under-18 team that won two silver medals at FIBA Europe Under-18 Championships. At the 2004 Championship in Spain, he had a 89–71 lost to Spain in the Final. At the 2005 Championship in Serbia and Montenegro, he lost in the tournament final to the host team.

Izić was the head coach of the Turkey under-20 team that won the silver medal at the 2006 FIBA Europe Under-20 Championship in Izmir, Turkey. He also led the team at the 2007 FIBA Europe Under-20 Championship.

Between 2007 and 2013, Izić was an assistant coach for the Turkey national team, under Bogdan Tanjević.

In January 2017, the Turkish Basketball Federation parted ways with Izic.

Career achievements and awards 
As player
 EuroLeague champion: 1 (with Bosna: 1978–79)
 Turkish Super League champion: 2 (with Galatasaray: 1984–85, 1985–86)
 Yugoslav League champion: 2 (with Bosna: 1977–78, 1979–80)
 Yugoslav Cup winner: 1 (with Bosna: 1977–78)
 Turkish President's Cup winner: 1 (with Galatasaray: 1985)

As head coach
 Turkish First League (2nd-tier) champion: 1 (with Tofaş: 2008–09)

References

External links
 Coach Profile at eurobasket.com
 Coach Profile at FIBA Europe
 Player Profile at TBLStat.net

1959 births
Living people
Basketbol Süper Ligi head coaches
Bosnia and Herzegovina basketball coaches
Bosnia and Herzegovina men's basketball players
Bosniaks of Bosnia and Herzegovina
Fenerbahçe basketball coaches
Galatasaray S.K. (men's basketball) players
KK Bosna Royal players
KK Radnik Bijeljina players
Naturalized citizens of Turkey
People from Bijeljina
Point guards
Tofaş S.K. coaches
Turkish basketball coaches
Turkish men's basketball players
Turkish people of Bosnia and Herzegovina descent
Yugoslav emigrants to Turkey
Yugoslav men's basketball players